The White River is a small and discontinuous  river located in southeastern Nevada notable for several endemic species of fish. The river was named for F. A. White, a 19th-century explorer.

Course
The White River begins at the Great Basin Divide in the White Pine Range near Ely, where it is fed by snowmelt and springs from Currant Mountain. Along the way it receives water from various springs on the slopes of the Grant Range to the west and the Egan Range to the east. It provides the water for a string of reservoirs along its course in the Sunnyside area, the largest being Adams-McGill Reservoir. State Route 318 runs mostly parallel to the river.

The channel continues into Coyote Springs Valley (location of the planned community Coyote Springs), becoming the Pahranagat Wash, which in turn connects to the Muddy River and thence to Lake Mead.

Fish 
The White River system features several endemic fish species:

 White River Colorado gila Gila robusta jordani
 White River speckled dace Rhinichthys osculus velifer
 White River spinedace Lepidomeda albivallis. Less than 50 of this endangered fish remained in 1993.
 Pahranagat spinedace Lepidomeda altivelis
 White River springfish Crenichthys baileyi

Also named for the area is the White River mountainsucker (Pantosteus intermedius) subspecies.

See also
List of rivers of Nevada
White River Narrows

References

External links
 Web-book: White River Valley, Nevada -- Then and Now 1898 to 1980

Rivers of Nevada
Tributaries of the Colorado River
Rivers of Clark County, Nevada
Rivers of White Pine County, Nevada
Rivers of Nye County, Nevada
Rivers of Lincoln County, Nevada